Hendrikus Johannes "Johan" Witteveen (12 June 1921 – 23 April 2019) was a Dutch politician and economist who served as the fifth managing director of the International Monetary Fund (IMF) from 1973 to 1978.
 
Witteveen attended the Gymnasium Erasmianum in Rotterdam from June 1933 until June 1939 and applied at the Rotterdam School of Economics in June 1939 majoring in Economics. On 10 May 1940 Nazi Germany invaded the Netherlands and the government fled to London to escape the German occupation. During the German occupation Witteveen continued his study obtaining a Bachelor of Economics degree in June 1941 but in April 1943 the German occupation authority closed the Rotterdam School of Economics. Following the end of World War II Witteveen returned to the Rotterdam School of Economics and worked as a student researcher before graduating with a Master of Economics degree in December 1945 and worked as an associate professor of Financial economics at the Rotterdam School of Economics from December 1945 until July 1947 when got a doctorate as an Doctor of Philosophy in Financial economics. Witteveen worked as a researcher for the Bureau for Economic Policy Analysis (CPB) from April 1945 until July 1947 and as a professor of Financial economics at the Rotterdam School of Economics from July 1947 until 24 July 1963. He also served as Rector Magnificus of the Erasmus University Rotterdam from 1 January 1951 until 1 January 1952.

Witteveen became a Member of the Senate after the death of Anthonie Nicolaas Molenaar, taking office on 23 December 1958 serving as a frontbencher and spokesperson for Finances and deputy spokesperson for Economic Affairs and Small business. Witteveen was elected as a Member of the House of Representatives after the election of 1963, he subsequently resigned as a Member of the Senate the same day he was installed as Member of the House of Representatives, taking office on 5 June 1963. Following the cabinet formation of 1963 Witteveen was appointed as Minister of Finance in the Cabinet Marijnen, taking office on 24 July 1963. The Cabinet Marijnen fell on 27 February 1965 after a disagreement in the coalition about reforms to the public broadcasting system and continued to serve in a demissionary capacity until the cabinet formation of 1965 when it was replaced by the Cabinet Cals on 14 April 1965. Witteveen returned as a distinguished professor of Public economics at the Rotterdam School of Economics on 1 September 1965. Witteveen subsequently returned as a Member of the House of Representatives after the resignation of Lambertus Oldenbanning, taking office on 21 September 1965 serving as a frontbencher chairing the parliamentary committee for Finances and spokesperson for Finances and deputy spokesperson for Economic Affairs. After the election of 1967 Witteveen was again appointed as Minister of Finance and became Deputy Prime Minister in the Cabinet De Jong, taking office on 5 April 1967. Witteveen served as acting Minister of Economic Affairs from 7 January 1970 until 14 January 1970 following Leo de Block's resignation. In February 1971 Witteveen announced that he wouldn't stand for the election of 1971 but wanted to return to the Senate. After the Senate election of 1971 Witteveen returned as a Member of the Senate, taking office on 8 June 1971 serving as a frontbencher chairing the parliamentary committee for Finances and spokesperson for Finances and Economic Affairs. Following the cabinet formation of 1971 Witteveen per his own request asked not to be considered for a cabinet post in the new cabinet, the Cabinet De Jong was replaced by the Cabinet Biesheuvel I on 6 July 1971. In August 1973 Witteveen was nominated as the next Managing Director of the International Monetary Fund (IMF), he resigned as a Member of the Senate the same day he was installed as Managing Director, serving from 1 September 1973 until 18 June 1978.

Witteveen retired after spending 20 years in national politics and became active in the private sector and public sector and occupied numerous seats as a corporate director and nonprofit director on several boards of directors and supervisory boards (Rockefeller Foundation, Tinbergen Institute, Group of Thirty, Institute of International Relations Clingendael, Society for Statistics and Operations Research and the Helen Dowling Institute) and served on several state commissions and councils on behalf of the government (SEO Economic Research, Cadastre Agency and Statistics Netherlands) and as an advocate and lobbyist for Sufism and Financial regulation. Witteveen was also a prolific author, having written more than a dozen books since 1947 about Politics, Finances, Economics, Business and Sufism.

Witteveen was known for his abilities as a manager and consensus builder. Witteveen continued to comment on political affairs as a statesman until his death at the age of 97 and holds the distinction as the only Dutchman that served as Managing Director of the International Monetary Fund. His eldest son Willem was also a politician, professor, and author, he like his father had served in the Senate.

Early life and education 
Witteveen was born on 12 June 1921 in Zeist in the province of Utrecht. He is the son of architect Willem Gerrit Witteveen and Anna Maria Wibaut and the grandson of Social Democratic politician Floor Wibaut. He went to the public secondary school Gymnasium Erasmianum in Rotterdam. He studied economics at the Netherlands School of Economics from 1939 to 1946. He received his PhD in 1947 with the dissertation Loonhoogte en werkgelegenheid (Height of wages and employment). His advisor was Nobel Prize laureate Jan Tinbergen.

Career 
Witteveen worked as an economist at the Bureau for Economic Policy Analysis under Jan Tinbergen and Fred Polak from 1947 until 1963. He is a member of the People's Party for Freedom and Democracy (VVD). He served as a Senator from 23 December 1958 until 5 June 1963 and as a member of the House of Representatives from 5 June 1963 until 24 July 1963.

He then became Minister of Finance in the Marijnen cabinet serving from 24 July 1963 until 14 April 1965. He then served as a Member of the House of Representatives again from 21 September 1965 until 5 April 1967, when he returned as Minister of Finance and Deputy Prime Minister serving from 5 April 1967 until 6 July 1971 in the De Jong cabinet. He again returned to the Senate, serving from 8 June 1971 until 1 September 1973.

Afterwards he became the Managing Director of the International Monetary Fund, serving from 1 September 1973 until 18 June 1978. From 1978 to 1985 he was the first chairman of the Washington-based economics body, the Group of Thirty. He became member of the Royal Netherlands Academy of Arts and Sciences in 1980.

Personal life 
On 3 March 1949 Witteveen married Liesbeth de Vries Feijens (born 1 April 1920). They had four children, three sons, and one daughter. Willem Witteveen (1952–2014), Paul Witteveen (1955–1979), Raoul Witteveen and their daughter (born 1960). Liesbeth de Vries Feijens died on 25 November 2006 at the age of 86. His eldest son Willem Witteveen was also a politician, professor and author, he like his father had served in the Senate. Willem Witteveen, his wife and daughter died on 17 July 2014 when Malaysia Airlines Flight 17 was shot down over Ukraine. Witteveen was also a first cousin once removed of the in 2004 murdered filmmaker Theo van Gogh.

Decorations

Honorary degrees

References

External links

Official
  Dr. H.J. (Johan) Witteveen Parlement & Politiek
  Dr. H.J. Witteveen (VVD) Eerste Kamer der Staten-Generaal

 

 

 
 

1921 births
2019 deaths
Businesspeople from Rotterdam
Commanders of the Order of the Netherlands Lion
Deputy Prime Ministers of the Netherlands
Dutch academic administrators
Dutch bankers
Dutch business writers
Dutch chief executives in the finance industry
Dutch corporate directors
Dutch essayists
Dutch expatriates in the United States
Dutch financial analysts
Dutch financial writers
Dutch health and wellness writers
Dutch lobbyists
Dutch memoirists
Dutch nonprofit directors
Dutch nonprofit executives
Dutch people of World War II
Dutch officials of the United Nations
Dutch spiritual writers
Erasmus University Rotterdam alumni
Academic staff of Erasmus University Rotterdam
Financial economists
Grand Crosses of the Order of the Crown (Belgium)
Grand Crosses with Star and Sash of the Order of Merit of the Federal Republic of Germany
Grand Officers of the Order of Orange-Nassau
Grand Officiers of the Légion d'honneur
Honorary Knights Commander of the Order of the British Empire
Ināyati Sufis
International economists
Managing directors of the International Monetary Fund
Members of the House of Representatives (Netherlands)
Members of the Royal Netherlands Academy of Arts and Sciences
Members of the Senate (Netherlands)
Members of the Social and Economic Council
Monetarists
Ministers of Economic Affairs of the Netherlands
Ministers of Finance of the Netherlands
Politicians from Rotterdam
People from Wassenaar
People from Zeist
People's Party for Freedom and Democracy politicians
Public economists
Recipients of the Four Freedoms Award
Rectors of universities in the Netherlands
Vice Chairmen of the People's Party for Freedom and Democracy
Writers from Rotterdam
20th-century Dutch civil servants
20th-century Dutch economists
20th-century Dutch male writers
20th-century Dutch politicians
21st-century Dutch economists
21st-century Dutch male writers